The Champions Mile is a Group 1 flat horse race in Hong Kong for three-year-old and above thoroughbreds run over a distance of 1,600 metres (approximately 1 mile) on the turf at Sha Tin Racecourse with the total purse of HK$14m in 2014/15, approximately US$1.8m.

It was first run in 2001, and was opened to international competition in 2005 and granted an international grade 1 status in 2007. The race is now the third leg of the four race Asian Mile Challenge, preceded by the Dubai Duty Free Stakes and followed by the Yasuda Kinen.

Winners

See also
 List of Hong Kong horse races

References
Racing Post:
 , 
  The Hong Kong Jockey Club – Introduction of BMW Champions Mile
 Racing Information of BMW Champions Mile (2011/12)
 The Hong Kong Jockey Club 
 Asian Mile Challenge

Horse races in Hong Kong
Open mile category horse races